Radha Modgil is a medical doctor and media personality.

Biography
Modgil studied at University of Cambridge gaining an MA and qualified as a doctor at Imperial College London. She worked for five years in hospital medicine in London and then trained for a further two years to qualify as a general practitioner. Modgil continues to practice as an NHS GP, as well as teaching and working in health promotion.

Modgil is the co-host for BBC Radio 1's The Surgery. She was the resident GP for Live with Gabby on Channel 5 and also for Newsround CBBC. She appeared as the medical reporter & presenter for The Sex Education Show Channel 4 (series 1–5) and Make My Body Younger BBC3 (Series 1–2).

Filmography

Television 

City Hospital, BBC One (2004)
Make My Body Younger, BBC Three Series 1, (2008)
Make My Body Younger, BBC Three Series 2, (2009)
ITV News at Ten (2010)
The Sex Education Show, Channel 4
Series 1 (2008)
Series 2: "The Sex Education Show vs Pornography" (2009)
Series 3: "Am I Normal?" (2010)
Series 4: "Stop Pimping Our Kids" (2011)
Series 5: "Britain's Sex Survey" (2012)
The Vanessa Show, Channel Five, (2011)
Live with Gaby, Channel Five, (2011–2012)
Dying for Clear Skin, BBC Three, (2012)
Chasing the Saturdays, E!, (2013)
BBC Breakfast, Online Safety/Bullying,BBC One (2013)
This Morning, Health Alert- Women's Health, ITV, (2013)
Channel 5 News - Older People & The NHS (2014)
ITV Tonight - Fuel Poverty & Health (2014)
Newsround - Resident GP and Expert for Food Week & Diabetes Special, CBBC, (2015)
Feeling Better, CBeebies (2018)

Radio
The Surgery with Katie and Dr Radha, Co-presenter, BBC Radio One
Interviews and medical broadcasting, LBC 2013
Interviews and Q & A, BBC Oxford 2012
Radio Europe 2012

Podcast
The Richard Nicholls Podcast (2020)
Blank Podcast (2020)

References

External links
Official website
Radio 1's Life Hacks (BBC Radio 1)

Living people
21st-century English medical doctors
English television presenters
1979 births